POSB may refer to any of the following:

 POSB Bank - a financial services provider in Singapore; formerly Post Office Savings Bank
 People's Own Savings Bank - a savings bank in Zimbabwe; formerly Post Office Savings Bank